Goidhoo as a place name may refer to:
 Goidhoo (Baa Atoll) (Republic of Maldives)
 Goidhoo (Shaviyani Atoll) (Republic of Maldives)